Sinan Kurt  (born 2 March 1995) is a German professional footballer who plays as a midfielder for Turkish club Eyüpspor.

Career
Kurt began his playing career in the Regionalliga, with VfL Bochum II and Rot-Weiß Oberhausen. He made his professional debut for Osmanlıspor in the Süper Lig in a 4–0 loss to Beşiktaş on 3 June 2017.

References

External links
 
 
 
 
 

1995 births
People from Moers
Sportspeople from Düsseldorf (region)
Footballers from North Rhine-Westphalia
German people of Turkish descent
Living people
German footballers
Association football midfielders
VfB Hüls players
VfL Bochum II players
Rot-Weiß Oberhausen players
Ankaraspor footballers
Adana Demirspor footballers
Eyüpspor footballers
Oberliga (football) players
Regionalliga players
Süper Lig players
TFF Second League players
TFF First League players
German expatriate footballers
Expatriate footballers in Turkey
German expatriate sportspeople in Turkey